The Canadian Champion Female Sprint Horse is a Canadian Thoroughbred horse racing honor that is part of the Sovereign Awards program awarded annually to the top female Thoroughbred horse competing in sprint races in Canada. Created in 1980 by the Jockey Club of Canada as a single award for Champion Sprinter, it was split into male and female categories in 2009.

Past winners

2009: Tribal Belle
2010: Indian Apple Is
2011: Atlantic Hurricane
2012: Roxy Gap
2013: Youcan'tcatchme
2014: Hillaby
2015: Miss Mischief
2016: River Maid
2017: Ami's Mesa
2018: Moonlit Promise
2019: Summer Sunday
2020: Artie's Princess

References
The Sovereign Awards at the Jockey Club of Canada

Horse racing awards
Horse racing in Canada
Sovereign Award winners